The Beaver Coat is a 1928 German silent comedy film directed by Erich Schönfelder and starring Ralph Arthur Roberts, Lucie Höflich and Wolfgang von Schwindt. It is based on Gerhart Hauptmann's play The Beaver Coat. It was made by the German subsidiary of First National Pictures.

It was shot at the Staaken Studios in Berlin. The film's art direction was by Bruno Lutz and Franz Seemann.

Cast
Ralph Arthur Roberts as Wehrhahn
Lucie Höflich as Mrs. Wolff
Wolfgang von Schwindt as Julian Wolff
La Jana as Leontine
Ilse Stobrawa as Adelheid
Rudolf Biebrach as Rentier Krüger
Josefine Dora as Krüger's wife
Paul Henckels as Mothes
Camilla von Hollay as Mothes's wife
Max Maximilian as Wulkow
Walter Formes as Dr. Fleischer
Heinrich Gotho as Mittendorf
Ernst Behmer as Glasenapp
Harry Gondi as Gustav, Leontine's fiancé
Ernst Pittschau

See also
The Beaver Coat (1937 film)
The Beaver Coat (1949 film)

References

External links

Films of the Weimar Republic
Films directed by Erich Schönfelder
German silent feature films
German films based on plays
Films based on works by Gerhart Hauptmann
German black-and-white films
1928 comedy films
German comedy films
Films shot at Staaken Studios
Silent comedy films
1920s German films